Pseudopterogorgia is a genus of soft coral sea fans in the family Gorgoniidae.

References

Gorgoniidae
Octocorallia genera